The 1974 USC Trojans baseball team represented the University of Southern California in the 1974 NCAA Division I baseball season. The team was coached Rod Dedeaux in his 33rd season.

The Trojans won the College World Series, defeating the Miami Hurricanes in the championship game, completing their run of five consecutive national championships.

Roster

Schedule 

! style="background:#FFCC00;color:#990000;"| Regular Season
|- 

|- align="center" bgcolor="ddffdd"
| February 10 || at  || 6–1 || 1–0 || –
|- align="center" bgcolor="ddffdd"
| February 18 ||  || 5–4 || 2–0 || –
|- align="center" bgcolor="ddffdd"
| February 18 || San Diego State || 5–3 || 3–0 || –
|- align="center" bgcolor="ddffdd"
| February 20 || at  || 18–5 || 4–0 || –
|- align="center" bgcolor="ddffdd"
| February 23 || vs.  || 5–1 || 5–0 || –
|- align="center" bgcolor="ddffdd"
| February 24 || at  || 9–7 || 6–0 || –
|- align="center" bgcolor="ddffdd"
| February 24 || at UNLV || 10–2 || 7–0 || –
|- align="center" bgcolor="ddffdd"
| February 26 ||  || 9–2 || 8–0 || –
|-

|- align="center" bgcolor="#ffdddd"
| March 1 ||  || 3–9 || 8–1 || –
|- align="center" bgcolor="ddffdd"
| March 5 || at  || 5–3 || 9–1 || –
|- align="center" bgcolor="ddffdd"
| March 10 || at  || 6–3 || 10–1 || –
|- align="center" bgcolor="#ddffdd"
| March 12 || at UC Irvine || 10–4 || 11–1 || –
|- align="center" bgcolor="ddffdd"
| March 13 || at  || 9–6 || 12–1 || –
|- align="center" bgcolor="ddffdd"
| March 14 || at  || 13–7 || 13–1 || –
|- align="center" bgcolor="ddffdd"
| March 15 ||  || 19–3 || 14–1 || –
|- align="center" bgcolor="ddffdd"
| March 15 || Air Force || 16–8 || 15–1 || –
|- align="center" bgcolor="#ddffdd"
| March 19 ||  || 8–6 || 16–1 || –
|- align="center" bgcolor="#ffdddd"
| March 20 || Santa Clara || 2–10 || 16–2 || –
|- align="center" bgcolor="ffdddd"
| March 22 ||  || 10–12 || 16–3 || –
|- align="center" bgcolor="ddffdd"
| March 23 || vs. Arizona State || 14–9 || 17–3 || –
|- align="center" bgcolor="ddffdd"
| March 25 || at  || 6–3 || 18–3 || –
|- align="center" bgcolor="ddffdd"
| March 26 ||  || 9–8 || 19–3 || –
|- align="center" bgcolor="ddffdd"
| March 30 ||  || 7–0 || 20–3 || 1–0
|- align="center" bgcolor="ddffdd"
| March 30 || California || 11–4 || 21–3 || 2–0
|- align="center" bgcolor="ddffdd"
| March 31 || California || 3–1 || 22–3 || 3–0
|-

|- align="center" bgcolor="ffdddd"
| April 5 || at  || 2–3 || 22–4 || 3–1
|- align="center" bgcolor="ddffdd"
| April 6 || at Stanford || 7–5 || 23–4 || 4–1
|- align="center" bgcolor="ffdddd"
| April 6 || at Stanford || 5–6 || 23–5 || 4–2
|- align="center" bgcolor="ddffdd"
| April 7 || at Arizona State || 6–4 || 24–5 || –
|- align="center" bgcolor="#ffdddd"
| April 9 || at  || 6–7 || 24–6 || –
|- align="center" bgcolor="#ffdddd"
| April 9 || at Oklahoma || 4–5 || 24–7 || –
|- align="center" bgcolor="#ddffdd"
| April 12 || at  || 8–2 || 25–7 || –
|- align="center" bgcolor="#ffdddd"
| April 13 || at Tulsa || 4–5 || 25–8 || –
|- align="center" bgcolor="#ffdddd"
| April 13 || at Tulsa || 7–11 || 25–9 || –
|- align="center" bgcolor="#ddffdd"
| April 14 || at Tulsa || 11–4 || 26–9 || –
|- align="center" bgcolor="ddffdd"
| April 15 ||  || 5–4 || 27–9 || –
|- align="center" bgcolor="#ddffdd"
| April 16 || Cal State Northridge || 7–6 || 28–9 || –
|- align="center" bgcolor="#ddffdd"
| April 19 || at  || 8–2 || 29–9 || 5–2
|- align="center" bgcolor="#ddffdd"
| April 20 || UCLA || 11–5 || 30–9 || 6–2
|- align="center" bgcolor="#ddffdd"
| April 20 || UCLA || 6–5 || 31–9 || 7–2
|- align="center" bgcolor="#ffdddd"
| April 23 || Pepperdine || 5–6 || 31–10 || –
|- align="center" bgcolor="#ddffdd"
| April 24 ||  || 9–6 || 32–10 || –
|- align="center" bgcolor="#ddffdd"
| April 26 || at California || 4–1 || 33–10 || 8–2
|- align="center" bgcolor="#ffdddd"
| April 27 || at California || 2–4 || 33–11 || 8–3
|- align="center" bgcolor="#ddffdd"
| April 27 || at California || 8–3 || 34–11 || 9–3
|- align="center" bgcolor="#ddffdd"
| April 28 || at Santa Clara || 9–2 || 35–11 || –
|- align="center" bgcolor="#ffdddd"
| April 30 || Cal Poly Pomona || 4–6 || 35–12 || –
|-

|- align="center" bgcolor="#ffdddd"
| May 3 || Stanford || 1–4 || 35–13 || 9–4
|- align="center" bgcolor="#ffdddd"
| May 4 || Stanford || 0–7 || 35–14 || 9–5
|- align="center" bgcolor="#ffdddd"
| May 4 || Stanford || 5–6 || 35–15 || 9–6
|- align="center" bgcolor="#ddffdd"
| May 6 || Chapman || 5–2 || 36–15 || –
|- align="center" bgcolor="#ffdddd"
| May 7 || Loyola Marymount || 4–6 || 36–16 || –
|- align="center" bgcolor="#ddffdd"
| May 8 || at Long Beach State || 7–5 || 37–16 || –
|- align="center" bgcolor="#ddffdd"
| May 10 || UCLA || 10–0 || 38–16 || 10–6
|- align="center" bgcolor="#ffdddd"
| May 11 || at UCLA || 5–6 || 38–17 || 10–7
|- align="center" bgcolor="#ddffdd"
| May 11 || at UCLA || 22–2 || 39–17 || 11–7
|-

|-
! style="background:#FFCC00;color:#990000;"| Post–Season
|-
|-

|- align="center" bgcolor="ddffdd"
| May 18 || vs.  || Dedeaux Field || 11–6 || 40–17
|- align="center" bgcolor="ddffdd"
| May 18 || vs. Oregon || Dedeaux Field || 14–1 || 41–17
|-

|- align="center" bgcolor="ddffdd"
| May 25 || vs. Cal State Los Angeles || Reeder Field || 9–2 || 42–17
|- align="center" bgcolor="ffdddd"
| May 26 || vs. Cal State Los Angeles || Reeder Field || 6–7 || 42–18
|- align="center" bgcolor="ddffdd"
| May 26 || vs. Cal State Los Angeles || Reeder Field || 11–9 || 43–18
|- align="center" bgcolor="ffdddd"
| June 1 || vs. Pepperdine || Dedeaux Field || 2–4 || 43–19
|- align="center" bgcolor="ddffdd"
| June 2 || vs. Pepperdine || Dedeaux Field || 4–1 || 44–19
|- align="center" bgcolor="ddffdd"
| June 2 || vs. Pepperdine || Dedeaux Field || 12–1 || 45–19
|-

|- align="center" bgcolor="ddffdd"
| June 8 || vs. Texas || Rosenblatt Stadium || 9–2 || 46–19
|- align="center" bgcolor="ddffdd"
| June 10 || vs.  || Rosenblatt Stadium || 5–3 || 47–19
|- align="center" bgcolor="ffdddd"
| June 12 || vs. Miami (FL) || Rosenblatt Stadium || 3–7 || 47–20
|- align="center" bgcolor="ddffdd"
| June 13 || vs. Texas || Rosenblatt Stadium || 5–3 || 48–20
|- align="center" bgcolor="ddffdd"
| June 14 || vs. Southern Illinois || Rosenblatt Stadium || 7–2 || 49–20
|- align="center" bgcolor="ddffdd"
| June 15 || vs. Miami (FL) || Rosenblatt Stadium || 7–3 || 50–20
|-

Awards and honors 
Rob Adolph
 College World Series All-Tournament Team

Mike Barr
 College World Series All-Tournament Team

Marvin Cobb
 College World Series All-Tournament Team

Rich Dauer
 All-America First Team
 College World Series All-Tournament Team
 All-Pacific-8 First Team

Russ McQueen
 All-Pacific-8 First Team

George Milke
 College World Series Most Outstanding Player

Bob Mitchell
 College World Series All-Tournament Team

Creighton Tevlin
 All-Pacific-8 First Team

Trojans in the 1974 MLB Draft 
The following members of the USC baseball program were drafted in the 1974 Major League Baseball Draft.

June regular draft

References 

USC
USC Trojans baseball seasons
College World Series seasons
NCAA Division I Baseball Championship seasons
Pac-12 Conference baseball champion seasons
USC Trojans baseball